Scinax proboscideus is a species of frog in the family Hylidae. It is found in French Guiana, Guyana, Suriname, and possibly Brazil. Its natural habitats are subtropical or tropical moist lowland forests and intermittent freshwater marshes.

References

proboscideus
Amphibians described in 1933
Taxonomy articles created by Polbot